Gabriel Ferry is the pen name of two French writers, father and son.

Gabriel Ferry the Elder
The elder, Eugène Louis Gabriel Ferry de Bellemare (November 1809 Grenoble - 3 January 1852), wrote adventure novels.  He spent 10 years in Mexico. He died at the age of 41 on his way to California, when the ship Amazon sunk in the Bay of Biscay after a fire caused by lightning. His most famous novel Le Coureur de Bois was 1879 revised for young readers under the title Der Waldläufer by the German writer Karl May.

Writings

Some of these works may actually be by Ferry the Younger:
 Une guerre en Sonora; souvenirs des côtes de l'Océan Pacifique, 1846
 Capitaine Don Blas et les jarochos, scenes de la vie mexicaine, 1848
 La clairière du bois des Hogues, récit des cotes et de la mer, 1851
 Impressions de voyages et aventures dans le Mexique, la Haute Californie et les régions de l'or, 1851
 Costal l'Indien ; roman historique. Scènes de la guerre de l'indépendance du Mexique, 1852
 Le crime du bois des Hogues, 1853
 Cabecillas y guerrilleros; scènes de la vie militaire au Mexique..., 1853
 Vagabond life in Mexico, 1856
 Le Coureur des bois, 1853 - Livre national-Aventures et Voyages N° 28 - Éditions Phébus (November 2009) 
 La chasse aux Cosaques, 1854
 Les aventures du capitaine Ruperto Castaños au Mexique, 1878
 Scènes de la vie sauvage au Mexique, 1879
 Les aventures d'un Français au pays des caciques, 1881

Gabriel Ferry the Younger
The younger (b. 30 May 1846) was at first connected with a bank, but soon followed in his father's footsteps and devoted himself to literature.

Writings
The younger Ferry wrote a number of plays, Réginah (1874), being one of the best. His miscellaneous prose includes Les dernières années d'Alexandre Dumas (Paris 1882); Les patriotes de 1816 (Paris 1883); Les deux maris de Marthe (Paris 1884); Balzac et ses amies (Paris 1888); Cap de fer (Paris 1889); Les exploits de César (Paris 1889); Les exploits de Martin (Paris 1890); Les prouesses de Martin Robert (Paris 1890) and others.

Notes

References
 The material on Gabriel Ferry the Elder comes from the Gabriel Ferry article on French Wikipedia (visited 20 October 2010).
 

1809 births
1852 deaths
19th-century French novelists
French male novelists
19th-century French male writers